Gustavo Lombardo (1885–1951) was an Italian film producer. He founded the Naples-based production company Lombardo Film in 1917, having previously made his reputation in film distribution. He was married to the actress Leda Gys who starred in his company's films He later moved his operations to Rome, setting up Titanus which he ran until his death in 1951. He was succeeded by his son Goffredo Lombardo.

Selected filmography
 Hands Off Me! (1937)
 Mad Animals (1939)
 The White Angel (1943)

References

Bibliography
 Moliterno, Gino. The A to Z of Italian Cinema. Scarecrow Press, 2009.

External links

1885 births
1951 deaths
Italian film producers
19th-century Neapolitan people
Titanus